Anthidium palliventre is a species of bee in the family Megachilidae, the leaf-cutter, carder, or mason bees.

Synonyms
Synonyms for this species include:
Anthidium pallidiventre Dalla Torre, 1896, emend
Anthidium californicum Cresson, 1879
Anthidium palliventre vanduzeei Cockerell, 1937

References

External links
Anatomical illustrations

palliventre
Insects described in 1878
Taxa named by Ezra Townsend Cresson